Trevor J. Pinch (1 January 1952 – 16 December 2021) was a British sociologist, part-time musician and chair of the Science and Technology Studies department at Cornell University. In 2018, he won the J.D. Bernal Prize from the Society for Social Studies of Science for "distinguished contributions to Science and Technology Studies over the course of [a] career".

Life and career
Pinch was born in Lisnaskea, Northern Ireland on 1 January 1952. He held a degree in Physics from Imperial College London and a PhD in Sociology from the University of Bath.

He taught sociology at the University of York before moving to the United States. Together with Wiebe Bijker, Pinch started the movement known as Social Construction of Technology (SCOT) within the sociology of science.

Pinch died from cancer, four years after his initial diagnosis, on 16 December 2021, at the age of 69.

Works
Pinch was a significant contributor to the study of Sound culture, and his books include a major study of Robert Moog. His book, Confronting Nature is widely considered the definitive sociological account of the history of the solar neutrino problem, and was mentioned by Raymond Davis in his 2002 Nobel Prize autobiography.

Books

Chapters in books

Journal articles

References

External links
Trevor Pinch at Cornell S&TS

1952 births
2021 deaths
Alumni of Imperial College London
Alumni of the University of Bath
Academics of the University of York
Cornell University faculty
Historians of technology
Scottish sociologists
Social constructionism
Sociologists of science
People from Lisnaskea